Augustyn Michał Stefan Radziejowski (3 December 1645 – 13 October 1705) was an archbishop of Gniezno and cardinal primate of the Roman Catholic Church in Poland, son of Hieronim Radziejowski. After the death of the Polish king John III Sobieski, he functioned as Interrex until the choice of a new king.

History 
Radziejowski first supported the candidacy of François Louis, Prince of Conti.  Later he supported August II the Strong, the eventual successor to John III.

Death 
He died in Gdańsk (Danzig), 13 October 1705.

References

External links
 Virtual tour Gniezno Cathedral  
List of Primates of Poland 

Michal
Ecclesiastical senators of the Polish–Lithuanian Commonwealth
1645 births
1705 deaths
Bishops of Warmia
Canons of Gniezno
Canons of Warmia
Archbishops of Gniezno
Diplomats of the Polish–Lithuanian Commonwealth
17th-century Polish cardinals
18th-century Polish–Lithuanian cardinals
Crown Vice-Chancellors